Keelan Leyser is a British-born magician, mentalist and quick change artist. Keelan is known for his multiple television appearances spanning over 25 years. He is recognised for his magic with digital technology and his quick change act.

Early life 
Leyser was raised in Coulsdon, Surrey. He attended The John Fisher School in Purley. Leyser was inspired to become a magician at the age of four after seeing magician Lance Burton perform in Las Vegas . In 1994, when he was 13 years old, Keelan won the title of British Junior Magical Champion at the British Magical Championships. When Leyser was 15 years old he performed for Prince Charles in Croydon, Surrey. After performing on many television shows, like Surprise Surprise, Blue Peter and This Morning, Leyser went on to tour the UK alongside Basil Brush in a show called The Fox Factor. Leyser was the magic consultant for the BBC 1 TV series called Dick and Dom in Da Bungalow. In 2005, Leyser won the cabaret section of the Ceroc Modern Jive Championships. In 2007, Leyser won the titles of British Magical Grand Prix Champion and the British Magical Champion of General Magic at the Blackpool Magic Convention. In 2010, Leyser was one of the main performers in the Hocus Pocus show in Cairo Egypt. Leyser now resides in Las Vegas, Nevada, US.

Television career 
Leyser first appeared on British television on Cilla Black's Surprise Surprise in 1994 where he performed a trick with Geoffrey Durham. After that the BBC filmed a documentary about Leyser on The Lowdown Series called 'The Magical World of Keelan Leyser' which was broadcast on BBC 1 on 16 April 1996, where Leyser was tipped to be the next David Copperfield.

Leyser was one of the main magicians on the 10 part TV series called Playing Tricks created by Endermol and broadcast first on Trouble TV in October 2003.

Leyser competed on the 3rd season of Britain's Got Talent in 2009 with his quick change act.

In 2011 Leyser, along with a partner Charlotte Marie, appeared on the first season of Penn and Teller Fool Us with his quick change act but failed to fool the duo. Leyser's act on the show has gained over 15 million views on YouTube. In 2013, Leyser competed on the French TV show The Best Le Meilleur Artiste on TF1 and was judged by fellow quick change artist Arturo Brachetti. Brachetti seemed delighted with their performance. On Saturday, 19 January 2013, at 18:45 Leyser was seen again with Charlotte Marie as the main guest act on BBC 1's Britain's Brightest. During the show, Leyser and Marie performed their act. Then, the host, Claire Balding, tested the contestants on their memory about Leyser's act. In 2014, Leyser performed his Digital Magic Act with SharRukh Khan and Deepika Padukone for the music launch of the Bollywood film Happy New Year. Leyser's performance on this show has gained over 3 million views on YouTube.

On 1 February 2015 Leyser trained up Emmerdale Actors Matthew Wolfenden and Natalie Anderson to perform his quick change act with himself and his  dance partner, Shereen, on Get Your Act Together presented by Stephen Mulhern  (broadcast on ITV). Also, in February 6, 2016, Leyser performed for the first time on The CW's Masters of Illusion, an American television show about magic. Leyser performed his quick change act with Shereen. In 2018, Leyser returned twice more on Season 6 of The CW's Masters of Illusion, but this time he performed technology themed magic tricks with iPads and iPhones. Leyser was back on Penn and Teller Fool Us on The CW on 23, September 2019, where he performed a prediction trick with Instagram, iPads and an iPhone.

In February 2022, Leyser was a featured guest on the Huckabee TV Show on the TBN network where he performed his iPad act and a mind reading trick with Mike Huckabee.

Awards 
 British Junior Magical Champion 1995
 British Magical Grand Prix Champion 2007
 British Magical Champion of General Magic 2007

References

External links 

 Official website
 

Year of birth missing (living people)
Living people